Terrasse-Vaudreuil is a small municipality on Île Perrot, just west of Montreal Island in Quebec, Canada. Attractions nearby include Le Faubourg de l'Île, the Terrasse-Vaudreuil baseball field, the soccer field, the municipal pool and POLYMOS, a styrofoam company that operates out of an area where gunpowder was produced during World War II. What started as a small cottage community has now evolved into miniature suburbia. Both entrances and exits of Terrasse-Vaudreuil are blocked by CP/CN train tracks, which has caused frustration in the past to residents. However, Terrasse does enjoy a beach that looks out onto Dorion and the Taschereau Bridge.

History
At the beginning of the 20th century, Terrasse-Vaudreuil was the site of a large powder magazine.

In 1948, its post office opened under the name Terrasse-Vaudreuil, in reference to its location on Lake of Two Mountains and its view towards Vaudreuil Bay and the town of Vaudreuil. In the 1950s, it began to see rapid residential development. The municipality was formed in 1952 when it separated from the Parish Municipality of Notre-Dame-de-l'Île-Perrot. In 1963, the post office closed.

Demographics

Language

Local government
List of former mayors:
 Donat Bouthillier (1952-1963, 1966-1975)
 Gérard Martin (1963-1966)
 Ronald Bourdeau (1975-1988)
 Paul-Émile Lamarche (1989-1998)
 Bernard Renaud (1998-2005)
 André Reynolds (2005-2009)
 Manon Trudel (2009-2013)
 Michel Bourdeau (2013–present)

Education
Commission Scolaire des Trois-Lacs operates Francophone schools.
 École José-Maria

Lester B. Pearson School Board operates Anglophone schools. It is zoned to Edgewater Elementary School and St. Patrick Elementary School in Pincourt.

See also
 List of municipalities in Quebec

References

External links

 Official website

Municipalities in Quebec
Incorporated places in Vaudreuil-Soulanges Regional County Municipality
Greater Montreal